Fastest Shed is a motorised shed designed and built by Kevin Nicks of Great Rollright, Chipping Norton, Oxfordshire, United Kingdom. The vehicle has been used to break the world land speed record for sheds three times since it was built in 2015, most recently with a speed of  set on 23 September 2018 at Pendine Sands in Wales.

Design and manufacture 
Kevin Nicks, a mechanic and gardener from Chipping Norton in Oxfordshire, United Kingdom came up with the idea of building the unusual vehicle in 2015, as a way of making use of a broken-down Volkswagen Passat he had in his garden. His original focus was to use the Shed for advertising - believing that major organisations would be interested in using a car covered in wood as a replacement for an online marketing strategy. Nicks took twelve months to build the steel frame and wooden shiplap bodywork, install the engine and to make the vehicle roadworthy. The total expenditure was about £50,000.

Trials and events 
In mid 2017, Nicks drove Fastest Shed from Land's End to John O'Groats to raise funds for a hospice charity. A few days after arriving in John O'Groats, Nicks embarked on the North Coast 500 route around the coast of Scotland, which he completed in 12 hours.

World records 

Technical details 
Fastest Shed's original build was based on a Volkswagen Passat 4Motion, including its  engine.
For the September 2018 record attempt, the vehicle was fitted with a  Audi RS4 (B5) engine. In an interview with Car Throttle, which aired on YouTube, Nicks has confirmed he changed the engine, replacing the existing B5 generation engine with an engine used in the B7 generation RS4, producing . It is also fitted with hydraulic suspension.

References 

Land speed record cars